George Aillères (born 3 December 1934, Poucharramet), is a French rugby league player who represented France in the 1968 World Cup. He is the father of the fellow France rugby league international Pierre Aillères. He is nicknamed "Le Cube" ("The Cube") due to his "imposing physical presence".

Playing career
Before switching to rugby league, Aillères played rugby union for Rieumes and then for Toulouse Olympique Employés Club. Later, he started his rugby league career playing for Toulouse Olympique, with which he arrived second at the championship final in 1964 and won a championship title in 1965. He then joined briefly Lézignan Sangliers, winning the Lord Derby Cup in 1966, before returning to Toulouse Olympique.
Aillères made his French debut in 1961. He toured New Zealand in 1964. He was selected as the French captain for the 1968 Rugby League World Cup. George played in his last match for France in 1970.

Legacy
The Georges Aillères French Cup is named in his honor.

References

Living people
1934 births
France national rugby league team captains
France national rugby league team players
French rugby league players
Lézignan Sangliers players
Rugby league props
Sportspeople from Haute-Garonne
Toulouse Olympique coaches
Toulouse Olympique players